William Edward Elsey was an Anglican bishop in the first half of the 20th century.

Early life 
Elsey was born into a sporting family on 4 July 1880 in Horncastle, Lincolnshire, England, and educated at King Edward VI Grammar School, Louth and Lincoln College, Oxford.

Religious life 
Ordained in 1905 Elsey was initially a curate at St Faith's Stepney and then its Priest in charge. In 1914 he began a long period of service overseas, firstly as a member of the Bush Brotherhood of St Boniface in the Anglican Diocese of Bunbury, Western Australia, then its Warden, following which he was elevated to the episcopate as Bishop of Kalgoorlie. During World War II, he was a chaplain to the Australian Armed Forces

Later life 
Elsey retired in 1950 and died in Perth, Western Australia on 25 September 1966.

References

1880 births
1966 deaths
People educated at King Edward VI Grammar School, Louth
Alumni of Lincoln College, Oxford
Alumni of Ripon College Cuddesdon
20th-century Anglican bishops in Australia
Anglican bishops of Kalgoorlie
Australian military chaplains
World War II chaplains
Bush Brotherhood priests